Glenea newmani is a species of beetle in the family Cerambycidae. It was described by James Thomson in 1874.

References

newmani
Beetles described in 1874